Danilo Alves de Freitas or simply Danilo Alves (born February 12, 1989 in Mato Grosso), is a Brazilian centre midfielder. He currently plays for Rio Branco SP.

Career
In 2009 debuted at the Palmeiras B.

References

External links

1989 births
Living people
Brazilian footballers
Sociedade Esportiva Palmeiras players
Olaria Atlético Clube players
Sport Club do Recife players
Guarani FC players
Vitória F.C. players
Atlético Clube Goianiense players
Deportivo Maldonado players
Rio Branco Esporte Clube players
Campeonato Brasileiro Série B players
Uruguayan Segunda División players
Brazilian expatriate footballers
Brazilian expatriate sportspeople in Uruguay
Brazilian expatriate sportspeople in Portugal
Expatriate footballers in Uruguay
Expatriate footballers in Portugal
Association football midfielders